Ptereleotris zebra, the Zebra barred dartfish, Chinese zebra goby, is a species of dartfish native to the Indian Ocean and the western Pacific Ocean. This species can reach a length of  SL. It can also be found in the aquarium trade.

References

External links
 

zebra
Fish described in 1938